Mellette County is a county in the U.S. state of South Dakota. As of the 2020 census, the population was 1,918. Its county seat is White River. The county was created in 1909, and was organized in 1911. It was named for Arthur C. Mellette, the last Governor of the Dakota Territory and the first Governor of the state of South Dakota.

Historically territory of the Sioux/Lakota peoples, 33.35 percent of the county's land is trust land associated with the Rosebud Indian Reservation in the neighboring county to the south. According to the 2000 United States Census, 52.2% of the population is Native American, mostly the federally recognized Sicangu Oyate (Upper Brulé Sioux) and the Rosebud Sioux Tribe, a branch of the Lakota people.

Geography
The White River flows eastward along the north boundary line of Mellette County. The Little White River flows northward through central Mellette County, discharging into White River. The terrain consists of semi-arid rolling hills, the northern portion dotted with ponds and small lakes. The area is mostly devoted to agriculture. The terrain slopes to the northeast; its highest point is the SW corner at 2,779' (847m) ASL.

The eastern portion of South Dakota's counties (48 of 66) observe Central Time; the western counties (18 of 66) observe Mountain Time. Mellette County is the westernmost of the SD counties to observe Central Time.

Major highways

  U.S. Highway 83
  South Dakota Highway 44
  South Dakota Highway 53
  South Dakota Highway 63

Adjacent counties

 Jones County - north
 Lyman County - northeast
 Tripp County - east
 Todd County - south
 Bennett County - southwest (observes Mountain Time)
 Jackson County - west (observes Mountain Time)

Demographics

2000 census
As of the 2000 United States Census, there were 2,083 people, 694 households, and 498 families in the county. The population density was 2 people per square mile (1/km2). There were 824 housing units at an average density of 0.6 per square mile (0.2/km2). The racial makeup of the county was 44.74% White, 52.42% Native American, 0.10% Asian, 0.24% from other races, and 2.50% from two or more races. 1.68% of the population were Hispanic or Latino of any race.

There were 694 households, out of which 38.90% had children under the age of 18 living with them, 46.80% were married couples living together, 16.70% had a female householder with no husband present, and 28.10% were non-families. 24.20% of all households were made up of individuals, and 10.50% had someone living alone who was 65 years of age or older. The average household size was 2.94 and the average family size was 3.49.

The county population contained 35.30% under the age of 18, 7.50% from 18 to 24, 24.60% from 25 to 44, 19.40% from 45 to 64, and 13.20% who were 65 years of age or older. The median age was 32 years. For every 100 females there were 101.30 males. For every 100 females age 18 and over, there were 100.60 males.

The median income for a household in the county was $23,219, and the median income for a family was $25,221. Males had a median income of $17,989 versus $17,989 for females. The per capita income for the county was $10,362. About 30.40% of families and 35.80% of the population were below the poverty line, including 45.70% of those under age 18 and 21.90% of those age 65 or over.

2010 census
As of the 2010 United States Census, there were 2,048 people, 693 households, and 493 families in the county. The racial makeup of the county was 54.1% American Indian, 39.7% white, 0.2% Asian, 0.1% black or African American, 0.2% from other races, and 5.6% from two or more races. Those of Hispanic or Latino origin made up 1.5% of the population. In terms of ancestry, 25.6% were German, 8.4% were Irish, 6.1% were English, and 0.6% were American.

Of the 693 households, 41.6% had children under the age of 18 living with them, 43.3% were married couples living together, 19.0% had a female householder with no husband present, 28.9% were non-families, and 24.7% of all households were made up of individuals. The average household size was 2.88 and the average family size was 3.38. The median age was 34.2 years.

The median income for a household in the county was $34,055 and the median income for a family was $35,781. Males had a median income of $31,625 versus $30,956 for females. The per capita income for the county was $16,971. About 23.4% of families and 27.0% of the population were below the poverty line, including 40.5% of those under age 18 and 6.3% of those age 65 or over.

Communities

City
 White River (county seat)

Town
 Wood

Census-designated places
 Corn Creek
 Horse Creek
 Norris

Unincorporated communities
 Mosher

Townships

 Bad Nation
 Blackpipe
 Butte
 Cody
 Fairview
 Mosher
 New Surprise Valley
 Norris
 Prospect
 Red Fish
 Ring Thunder
 Riverside
 Rocky Ford
 Rosebud
 Running Bird
 Surprise Valley

Unorganized territories
 Cedarbutte
 Central Mellette.

Politics
Like most of South Dakota, Mellette County is solidly Republican. It has not been carried by a Democrat since Lyndon Johnson’s 1964 landslide, although Barack Obama came within six votes of doing so in the 2012 election.

See also

 National Register of Historic Places listings in Mellette County, South Dakota

References

Further reading

  Part of a series on South Dakota counties.

 
1911 establishments in South Dakota
Populated places established in 1911